Musicraft Records was a record company and label established in 1937 in New York City.

Catalogue
Musicraft's catalog encompassed many different musical styles, including classical music, folk, jazz, Latin, popular vocal, and calypso.

Artists who recorded for Musicraft include singer Mel Torme, vocalist Sarah Vaughan, vocalist Mindy Carson, Duke Ellington, bebop comic Harry "the Hipster" Gibson, pianist Teddy Wilson, blues pioneer Lead Belly, poet Carl Sandburg, Dizzy Gillespie, Georgie Auld, Artie Shaw, Buddy Greco, Billie Rogers, and others.  Jazz accordionist Art Van Damme made his first recordings for the label.

According to the New York Public Library, the first original cast album, a set of songs recorded by the cast of The Cradle Will Rock, by Marc Blitzstein, was released in 1938 on Musicraft.

Composer/musician Walter Gross was an A&R executive and arranger for the label in the late 1940s. International music entrepreneur Peter Fritsch was an executive for Musicraft in the late 1940s before leaving to found Lyrichord Discs.

After Musicraft's demise, jazz authority and promoter Albert Marx acquired the label's catalog and reissued many titles on his Discovery Records label.

See also
 List of record labels

References

External links

 Guide to the Musicraft Records, Inc., Records 1937–1960 (MC 021), Institute of Jazz Studies, Rutgers University Libraries
Time Magazine story about Musicraft Records, December 9, 1940
Musicraft discography
 Musicraft Records on the Internet Archive's Great 78 Project

Defunct record labels of the United States
Jazz record labels